Salam al-Zaubai (1958/1959 – 19 December 2022) was an Iraqi politician who was the Deputy Prime Minister of Iraq from 20 May 2006 to 1 August 2007 as well as the acting Defence Minister from 20 May 2006 to 8 June 2006. He was elected to the Iraqi National Assembly in December 2005 as part of the Sunni Arab-led Iraqi Accord Front list.

He was from a well known tribe, the Zoba'a, and headed the Agriculture Engineers Union.

On 23 March 2007, Zaubai was wounded in an attack involving a suicide bombing and car bombing at a mosque near his home in Baghdad, and he was taken to a U.S. military hospital in the Green Zone for surgery. His adviser was reportedly killed in the attack, along with a number of his guards. A brother and cousin of Zaubai, as well as the mosque's imam, were also said to have been killed. The bomber attacked al-Zubaie a day after an al-Qaida umbrella group, the Islamic State of Iraq called him a stooge “to the crusader occupiers.” Hours after the assassination attempt the group claimed responsibility for the bombing. On 28 March, he was moved to Amman, Jordan for treatment at the King Hussein Medical Center, and he was released from the hospital on 3 April.

References

1950s births
2022 deaths
Iraqi Sunni Muslims
Government ministers of Iraq
Members of the Council of Representatives of Iraq
Year of birth missing
21st-century Iraqi politicians